Lorenzo Enrique Reyes Vicencio (born 13 June 1991) is a Chilean professional footballer who plays as a central midfielder for the Chile national team.

Club career

Huachipato
Born in Santiago, Reyes began his career with lowly Atlético Valdés, and later moved to Huachipato at the age of 16. He made his debut on 1 March 2009, coming on as a late substitute in a 2–0 home win over Universidad Católica. His first goal came on 17 April, in a 3–1 home win over Iquique.

Reyes retained a place in the centre of midfield for the following seasons, also being named in the best XI of the championship in the 2012 and 2013 seasons. He was also named captain of Huachipato in 2012.

Betis
On 13 June 2013, Reyes signed a four-year deal with La Liga side Real Betis. He made his debut for the Verdiblancos on 15 September, as a second-half substitute in a 3–1 home win over Valencia.

On 31 August 2015, Reyes was loaned to Almería in Segunda División, in a season-long deal. After his loan expired, he was deemed surplus to requirements by his parent club and rescinded his contract on 5 July 2016.

Universidad de Chile
Shortly after rescinding with Betis, Reyes returned to his home country and signed for Universidad de Chile. He immediately became a starter for the side, winning the 2016 Torneo Clausura with the club.

Atlas
On 23 June 2018, Reyes signed a three-year contract with Liga MX side Atlas. He was initially a first-choice, but was sidelined for six months during the 2018–19 season after suffering an Achilles tendon injury, and missed the 2019 Copa América.

Mazatlán
On 11 December 2020, Reyes moved to fellow league team Mazatlán, but left the club the following 12 August after just nine matches.

International career
Reyes represented Chile at under-20 level in the 2011 South American U-20 Championship, scoring once in nine appearances as his side reached the final stages. He made his full international debut on 21 December of that year, starting in a 3–2 friendly win over Paraguay in La Serena.

After being called up sparingly by manager Jorge Sampaoli in 2012 and 2013, Reyes only appeared again for the national side on 31 May 2018, in a 2–3 loss against Romania at the Sportzentrum Graz-Weinzödl in Graz, Austria.

Career statistics

Club

International

International goals
Scores and results list Chile's goal tally first.

Honours

Player
Huachipato
 Primera División de Chile: 2012 Clausura

Universidad de Chile
 Primera División de Chile: 2017 Clausura

References

External links

1991 births
Living people
People from Santiago
Chilean footballers
Chilean expatriate footballers
Chile international footballers
Chile under-20 international footballers
Chile youth international footballers
Association football midfielders
Chilean Primera División players
C.D. Huachipato footballers
Universidad de Chile footballers
La Liga players
Segunda División players
Real Betis players
UD Almería players
Liga MX players
Atlas F.C. footballers
Mazatlán F.C. footballers
Chilean expatriate sportspeople in Spain
Chilean expatriate sportspeople in Mexico
Expatriate footballers in Spain
Expatriate footballers in Mexico